The Uzbekistan League Cup is an annual knockout football competition in men's domestic Uzbek football. Organised by the Uzbekistan Professional Football League Organization and Uzbekistan Football Association since 2010, though the tournament was not held between 2016 and 2018.

History

Traditional the cup was held during January and February, in anticipation of the new season of the Uzbek league season, giving many clubs that don't hold training camps abroad the opportunity to conduct pre-season training.

On 26 February 2019, the Uzbekistan Football Association announced the rival of the Uzbekistan League Cup, with 14 Uzbekistan Super League clubs and 2 Uzbekistan Pro League clubs entering. On 10 May 2019, the four groups where announced.

In 2020, Kyrgyz Premier League clubs Dordoi Bishkek, Alay Osh, Abdysh-Ata Kant and Kaganat accepted an invitation to take part in the League Cup, whilst Khujand, Regar-TadAZ, Kuktosh Rudaki and Istaravshan all accepted invitations on behalf of the Tajikistan Higher League.

Finals

Results by club

References

External links
 Official Website

 
National association football cups
Football cup competitions in Uzbekistan
Recurring sporting events established in 2010